Shivadeva I (also spelled Sivadeva) was a king of the Licchavi dynasty who ruled Nepal in around 590 C.E. He was the son of Mana Deva II and  lived in a nine-storeyed palace called the Kailashkut Bhavan.

Political life 
In 598 C.E, a feudal lord, Amshuverma, who belonged to the Vaisya clan, rose to a position of an influential officer and assumed the title of Maharajadhiraj reducing Shivadeva to a mere figurehead. Rather than resisting Amshuverma's rise, he married his daughter to him. Upon his death, his son-in-law Amshuverma succeeded him as the king.

References 

Licchavi kingdom
Nepalese monarchs
History of Nepal
Year of birth missing (living people)
Living people